The Battle of Prague, which occurred between 25 July and 1 November 1648 was the last action of the Thirty Years' War. While the negotiations for the Peace of Westphalia were proceeding, the Swedes took the opportunity to mount one last campaign into Bohemia. The main result, and probably the main aim, was to loot the fabulous art collection assembled in Prague Castle by Rudolf II, Holy Roman Emperor (1552–1612), the pick of which was taken down the Elbe in barges and shipped to Sweden.

After occupying the castle and the western bank of the Vltava for some months, the Swedes stopped assaulting the Old and New Town at the eastern bank when news of the signing of the treaty reached them. They still remained a garrison on the western bank until their final withdrawal on 30 September 1649.

It was the last major clash of the Thirty Years' War, taking place in the city of Prague, where the war originally began 30 years earlier.

Overview
General Hans Christoff von Königsmarck, commanding Sweden's flying column, entered the city, which was defended by the Governor Feldmarschall Rudolf von Colloredo, a veteran of the siege of Mantua and of the battle of Lutzen, where he served under Albrecht von Wallenstein. The Swedes by a sudden night raid conquered whole part of Prague on the left (western) bank of the Vltava river – i.e. Prague Castle and quarters Hradčany and Lesser Town – and completely looted those rich districts. Two days later they attempted to enter the Old Town on the eastern bank of the river, but were repulsed on the Charles Bridge by Colloredo's men. When a third Swedish army commanded by Prince Carl Gustaf came close to Prague (25 September), all three Swedish armies launched a number of attacks against the city – not only from west, via the Charles Bridge, but also from north (bombardment from the Letná Plain) and especially from eastern plains, towards another city quarter, the New Town. These attacks were repelled largely thanks to the skill of the Feldmarschall and the energy of his troops, as well the fierce resistance of the burghers' militia and student volunteer troops (Academic Legion) under Czech Jesuit priest Jiří Plachý and German jurist Hans Georg Kauffer.

Sack of Prague
Unable to enter the other half of the city, the Swedes settled for looting the castle and surrounding palaces and monasteries; some have argued that this was the main purpose of the raid. Many of the treasures collected by Emperor Rudolf II (such as the Codex Gigas and Codex Argenteus) were taken to Sweden, where some can be found in Drottningholm Palace, for example several statues by Adrien de Vries.  The cream of the artworks were taken into exile by Christina, Queen of Sweden (r. 1632–1654), and dispersed in groups after her death in 1689, the paintings forming the core of the Orleans Collection, which was sold in London after the French Revolution, so that many of Rudolf's paintings are now in the United Kingdom. A Swedish inventory of 1652 lists 472 paintings as having come from Prague.

Monuments
On the Old Town Square a Marian column was erected to remember the salvation of Prague.

A monument erected during the 19th century on Colloredo's tomb in the Church of the Maltese Order in Prague recalls his victory over the Swedes. Its German inscription reads thus:

HIER RUHT RUDOLF GRAF COLLOREDO
K.K. FELDMARSCHALL UND MALTHESERORDER GROSSPRIOR
Vertheidiger der Alt und Neusstad Prags gegen die Schweden
Geb. am 2 Nov. 1585
Gest. am 27 Jan. 1657.

("Here lies Rudolf, count Colloredo, 
Imperial and Royal Feldmarshall and Grand Prior of the Order of Malta, 
defender of the Old and New Town of Prague against the Swedes.
Born 2. Nov. 1585
Dead 27 Jan. 1657")

On Charles Bridge tower a 17th-century Latin inscription says:

SISTE VIATOR, SED LUBENS, AC VOLENS UBI SISTERE DEBUIT, SED COACTUS GOTHORUM, AC VANDALORUM FUROR

"Rest here, walker, and be happy: you can stop here willing, but unwilling were stopped the Goths (Swedes) and their Vandalic ferocity"

Notes

1648 in Europe
Battles involving Bohemia
Battles involving Sweden
Prague 1648
Last stands
Prague 1648
Conflicts in 1648
Battle 1648
17th century in Prague
Battle of Prague